London Motorexpo was an annual motor show held from 1996 until 2015 in London.

It was launched in 1996 as a free outdoor alternative to the British International Motor Show and the London Motor Show. Held in Canary Wharf, it was designed to allow office workers a chance to see new cars without having to take time off to visit a traditional motor show.

The London Motorexpo normally took place in June, and often featured the first public viewing of new cars, though rarely concept cars as in a traditional motor show.

The final show took place in 2015.

2014

The 2014 show included the UK launches of the Aston Martin Vanquish and Tesla Model S right-hand-drive.

2013
The 2013 show included the UK introductions of the revised Skoda Superb, Jaguar XJR and Lightning GT.

2011
The 2011 expo opened on 6 June and included a convoy of 50 Jaguar E-Types driven from Hyde Park to Canary Wharf to mark the car's 50th anniversary. The BMW 6 Series Coupe and Mercedes-Benz SLS AMG were some of the cars shown for the first time.

2010
The 2010 show opened on 7 June and included the first viewing of the Mercedes-Benz E-Class Cabriolet and SLS AMG, Mini Countryman, Saab 9-5 and Volvo S60.

2009
The 2009 expo included the UK launch of the Aston Martin DBS convertible and Aston Martin Vantage V12, Cadillac CTS-V, Jaguar XFR and XKR, Saab 9-3X and Tesla Roadster.

2008
The 2008 show opened on 9 June and included the launch of the BMW X6 and the world premiere of the Breckland Beira V8, a British sports car based on the GM Kappa platform that never reached production.

2004
The 2004 show was sponsored by The Daily Telegraph and featured 50 exhibitors.

References

External links

Auto shows in the United Kingdom
Recurring events established in 1996
Recurring events disestablished in 2015
1996 establishments in England
2015 disestablishments in England